The Panará are an Indigenous people of Mato Grosso in the Brazilian Amazon. They farm and are hunter-gatherers.

Name
They were formerly called the Kreen-Akrore. Other names for the Panará include Kreen Akarore, Kren Akarore, Krenhakarore, Krenhakore, Krenakore, Krenakarore or Krenacarore, and "Índios Gigantes" ("Giant Indians") – all variants of the Mẽbêngôkre name Krã jàkàràre , meaning "roundlike cuthead", a reference to their traditional hair style which identifies them.

Language
The Panará speak the Panará language, which is classified as a Goyaz Jê language, belonging to the Jê language family (Macro-Jê). It is written in the Latin script.

Origin
The Panará are the last descendants of the Southern Kayapó, a large ethnic group which inhabited a vast area in Central Brazil in the 18th century, from the northern borders of the state of São Paulo, Triângulo Mineiro and south of Goiás, stretching eastwards from Mato Grosso, eastern and southeastern portion of Mato Grosso do Sul. Latest researches indicate that Southern Kayapó and Panará are in fact one single language. Linguistically, the Panará (and the Southern Kayapó) are a Jê-speaking group of Central Brazil; their language is most closely related to the Northern Jê group, which encompasses Mẽbêngôkre, Kĩsêdjê, Tapayúna, Apinajé, and Timbira languages.

Contact
In 1961 a British explorer by the name of Richard Mason was killed by the Panará people while exploring a previously unexplored region, which was assured to be free of indigenous individuals. The Panará people in 1967 approached a Brazilian airbase on the Cachimbo range. They were interested in the airplanes, because they believed them to be living creatures. The group was reported to be made up of women and children and non hostile, was considered a war party by the military. The soldiers were ordered to fire over the heads of the “wild Indians” and a soon landing plane was used to successfully terrifying the Panará into fleeing. 
In 1970 an expedition was formed to make contact with the Panará headed by the Villas-Bôas brothers. Claudio and Orlando worked for the government at the indigenous reserve, Xingu National Park, in Brazil, and were interested in learning more upon hearing of the capture of one of the Panará tribes children by a rival tribe, as well as their hopes that contact with Panará would prevent conflict when they learned that the (Cuiabá-Santarém) road BR-163 planned to cut straight through their territory. The leaders of the expedition gathered members of other tribes who had once been isolated but who now lived on in Parque do Xingu and set out on to make contact. Despite many months of leaving intended gifts for the Panará at one of their banana and maize plantations the expedition was unable to make any real contact with them other than a few visual encounters as well as few gifts which the Panará left them in return. After the expedition was over, The Panará lived in relative isolation until three years later in 1973 when the government project (Cuiabá-Santarém) road BR-163 was built through their territory. As a result, the tribe was decimated by newly introduced diseases and suffered from the environmental degradation of their land. Of the more than 350 members of the Panará tribe, more than 250 perished in the first twelve months after their first contact with colonizers.

Life in Xingu
On 12 January 1975, the 79 surviving members of the tribe were transferred by the government to the indigenous reserve Xingu National Park, and forced to live in proximity with former enemies, under state supervision. A working team from the Escola Paulista de Medicina examed 27 of the 29 newcomers, adults over 20 years old. The average height was 1.67m, which corresponded to the average height of those from the Jê group, a little taller than the those from Alto Xingu.

Twenty years later the Panará began negotiations to move home to their original territory. However, much of their old land had been degraded by prospectors, gold panning, settlement or cattle breeding (six out of eight of their old villages had been destroyed), but one large stretch of unspoiled dense forest could still be identified. In 1994 the tribe elders met with Xingu Park leaders and FUNAI to demand the right to move back to their original territory, and were eventually allowed 4,950 square kilometres from their ancient traditional territory along the Iriri River located on the border of Mato Grosso and Pará states.

Between 1995 and 1996, the Panará gradually moved to a new village called Nãsẽpotiti in their traditional land, and on 1 November 1996 the Justice Minister declared the Panará Indigenous Land a "permanent indigenous possession". By 2004 the number of Panará was around 250, and in 2008 they were 374. In 2010 there were 437 Panará.

They have expanded to four villages in the Panara indigenous land, (2012) some have moved up river to build the village of Sõnkwêê. In (2014) Sõkârãsâ was nearing its final stage of completion. (2016) Kôtikô was built on the Ipiranga river in the opposite corner of their indigenous land. The population of the Panará people is estimated to be around 500-600 as of 2018.

The Panará hunt in the Xingu with traditional methods along with the additional firearms, often favouring traditional bows and arrows when it comes to small water game. They utilize slash and burn agriculture which has been a part of their culture before the introduction of new tools to assist and crops to use. Modern equipment has displaced some traditional tools, metal tools are used side by side with traditional, including firearms. However, for certain activities, like small game fishing, Bows are still preferred. 
The Panará use a well known method to contain and utilize the Fire resistance Flora via to alter the landscape in their favour as well as acquire sapé grass to be used for thatch housing. They also burn crop waste and around paths to keep them clear of plant life or help clear out bees to collect honey.  They are also observed to leave fires from cooking lit to burn out naturally as even in the height of dry seen they extinguish.

Village Orientation and Matralienal Structure
Households follow matrilineal lines within each of the four clans with the village houses also arranged into four quarters for each of the clans. They also follow a uxorilocal habitation, where the male moves into the household of the woman when they marry, as well as the man becoming a member of his wife's clan especially after the first child is born. Marrying into the same clan, or having any romance between clan members is seen as “unthinkable” by the Panará. Furthermore, they live in villages in a circular structure around the inkâ, meaning “men’s house”; the surrounding structures' entrances face the inside towards the inkâ where meetings and discussions about the community take place. It is called the “men’s house” as the unmarried adult men sleep there traditionally.

In popular culture
 On Paul McCartney's 1970 album McCartney, the closing track is called "Kreen-Akrore". Alcatrazz's 1983 album No Parole from Rock 'n' Roll also contains a song, 'Kree Nakoorie'.
 They appeared in The Amazon Trail game where Claudio Villas Boas sends the player on a mission to find them and ask them to join his park, naturally they refuse, just as he had thought.
 They were the subject of a documentary named "The Tribe That Hides From Man."

See also
 Villas Boas brothers
 Indigenous peoples in Brazil
 Xingu National Park

References

External links
 The Panará: A Story of Hope
 National Geographic: effects of logging in the Amazon Basin
 Resources on the Panará language at Etnolinguistica.Org
 The Tribe That Hides From Man (1970) YouTube documentary chronicling the search for the Kreen-Akrore prior to first contact.

Indigenous peoples in Brazil
Indigenous peoples of the Amazon
Hunter-gatherers of South America